The Military Armament Corporation Model 10, officially abbreviated as "M10" or "M-10", and more commonly known as the MAC-10, is a compact, blowback operated machine pistol/submachine gun that was developed by Gordon B. Ingram in 1964.  It is chambered in either .45 ACP or 9mm. A two-stage suppressor by Sionics was designed for the MAC-10, which not only abates the noise created, but makes it easier to control on full automatic (although it also makes the gun far less compact and concealable). 

Military Armament Corporation never used the "MAC-10" nomenclature in its catalogs or sales literature, but "MAC-10" is frequently used by Title II dealers, gun writers, and collectors. For a decade, the semi-automatic pistol version of the weapon was forbidden in the U.S. under the assault weapons ban enacted by Congress in 1994.

Design
The MAC-10 is built predominantly from steel stampings. A notched cocking handle protrudes from the top of the receiver, and turning the handle 90°, locks the bolt, and acts as an indicator the weapon is unable to fire. The MAC-10 has a telescoping bolt, which wraps around the rear face of the barrel. This allows a more compact weapon and balances the weight of the weapon over the pistol grip, where the magazine is located. The MAC-10 fires from an open bolt, and the light weight of the bolt results in a rapid rate of fire. In addition, this design incorporates a built in feed ramp as part of the trigger guard (a new concept at the time) and, to save on cost, the magazine design was recycled from the M3 Grease Gun. The barrel is threaded to accept a suppressor, which works by reducing the discharge's sound without attempting to reduce the speed of the bullet. This works well with the .45 ACP versions, as most loads are subsonic already, as opposed to special, low-powered subsonic loads usually required for suppressed 9mm weapons. At the suggestion of the United States Army, the suppressor also acts as a foregrip to inhibit muzzle rise when fired. Ingram added a small bracket with a small strap beneath the muzzle to aid in controlling recoil during fully automatic fire. The original rate of fire for the MAC-10 in .45 ACP is approximately 1090 rounds per minute. That of the 9mm is approximately 1250, and that of the smaller MAC-11 in .380 ACP is 1500 rounds per minute.

Noting the weapon's poor accuracy, in the 1970s, International Association of Police Chiefs weapons researcher David Steele described the MAC series as "fit only for combat in a phone booth".

Suppressor
The primary reason for the original M10 finding recognition was its revolutionary sound suppressor designed by Mitchell WerBell III of Sionics. This suppressor has a two-stage design, with the first stage being larger than the second. This uniquely shaped suppressor gives the MAC-10 a very distinctive look. It is also very quiet, to the point that the bolt can be heard cycling, along with the suppressed report of the weapon's discharge, though only if subsonic rounds are used (standard .45 ACP rounds are subsonic). The suppressor, when used with a Nomex cover, creates a place to hold the firearm with the secondary hand, making it easier to control. During the 1970s, the United States placed restrictions on the export of suppressors, and a number of countries canceled their orders as the effectiveness of the MAC-10's suppressor was one of its main selling points. This was one factor that led to the bankruptcy of Military Armament Corporation, another being the company's failure to recognize the private market. The original Sionics suppressor is 11.44inches in length, 2.13inches in overall diameter, and weighs 1.20 pounds.

Calibers and variants
While the original M10 was available chambered for either .45 ACP or 9mm, the M10 is part of a series of machine pistols, the others being the MAC-11/M-11A1, which is a scaled-down version of the M10 chambered in .380 ACP (9×17mm); and the M-11/9, which is a modified version of the M-11 with a longer receiver chambered in 9×19mm, later made by SWD (Sylvia and Wayne Daniel), Leinad and Vulcan Armament. Law enforcement bureaucracies such as the Minnesota Bureau of Criminal Apprehension (BCA) consider MAC-11 variants such as the Leinad PM-11 to be part of the "MAC-10 class pistol".

In the United States, machine guns are National Firearms Act items. As the Military Armament Corporation was in bankruptcy, a large number of incomplete sheet metal frame flats were given serial numbers and then bought by a new company, RPB Industries. Some of the previously completed guns, which were already stamped with MAC, were then stamped with RPB on the reverse side, making it a "double stamp" gun.

RPB Industries made many open-bolt semi-automatic and sub-machine guns before the Bureau of Alcohol, Tobacco, Firearms and Explosives (BATFE) seized roughly 200 open-bolt semi-autos during the drug wars of 1981. The BATFE insisted that all future semi-automatic firearms were to be manufactured with a closed-bolt design as the open-bolt semi-automatics were considered too easy to illegally convert to full automatic operation.

Wayne Daniel, a former RPB machine operator, purchased much of their remaining inventory and formed SWD, designing a new weapon which was more balanced, available either fully or semi-automatic with his new BATFE-approved closed bolt design.

There are several carbine versions of the M-11/9 and Cobray and SWD manufactured a smaller version chambered in .380 ACP as a semiautomatic pistol called the M-12.

Today, while the civilian manufacture, sale and possession of post-1986 select-fire MAC-10 and variants is prohibited, it is still legal to sell templates, tooling and manuals to complete such conversions. These items are typically marketed as being "post-sample" materials for use by Federal Firearm Licensees for manufacturing/distributing select-fire variants of the MAC-10 to law enforcement, military and overseas customers.

1994 assault weapons ban in the U.S.
The semi-automatic civilian pistol version of the MAC-10, which operates differently from its military counterpart, fell under the 1994 Assault Weapons Ban. The ban – which expired in 2004 – enacted various requirements that defined an assault weapon. The MAC-10 was named directly in the ban, and it failed three of the requirements: 
A semi-automatic version of an automatic firearm,
A manufactured weight of 50 ounces (1.4kg) or more when the pistol is unloaded. The MAC-10 weighs 100.16 oz (2.84kg), and
A threaded barrel to attach barrel extender, flash suppressor, handgrip, or suppressor

Additionally, the magazine capacity is 32 rounds. In response, Wayne Daniel redesigned the M-11 by eliminating the threaded barrel and creating a new magazine release that would only allow the firearm to accept a new 10-round magazine, as the 1994 Assault Weapons Ban mandated. The new firearm was called the PM11/9.

Foreign copies and derivatives

BXP
The BXP is a 9mm submachine gun developed in the mid-1980s by the South African company Mechem (currently a division of Denel, formerly under ARMSCOR) and brought into production in 1984. Due to international arms embargoes of Apartheid South Africa, the country was forced to design and manufacture their own weapons. The weapon was intended for use by security forces. The manufacturing rights have changed hands several times, passing from Mechem to Milkor Marketing and later to Truvelo Armoury, the current manufacturer.

Cobra carbine
The Cobra carbine is a semi-automatic firearm of Rhodesian origin manufactured during the Rhodesian Bush War Era as a self-defense weapon for farmers and is chambered for the 9×19mm Parabellum round. The layout of this weapon is somewhat based on the Uzi submachine gun.

Patria submachine gun
The Pistola Ametralladora Patria is a close copy of the MAC-10 and features a cooling jacket/barrel extension much like the South African BXP. It was developed by Major Luis Ricardo Dávila, of the Argentine Air Force, and protected by national Patent n° 220494/5/6/7 on 20/08/1980. It uses 9mm rounds for easy transportation, and can be operated in either hand. A similar earlier Argentine weapon based on the MAC-10 was also designed in 1977 by manufacturer Domingo Matheu, the Pistola Ametralladora MPA.

Enarm MSM
The Enarm MSM (Mini Sub Metralhadora or Mini Submachine Gun) was a submachine gun of Brazilian origin based on the Uzi and MAC-10 weapons, made by ENARM. It was chambered in the 9×19mm Parabellum round and also came with a foregrip. Although the weapon performed well in trials, it was discontinued due to the company disbanding due to "internal disruptions".

Section Five MAC-10
Section Five Firearms Ltd of Tunbridge Wells, Kent in the UK manufactured a MAC-10 variation in 9×19 Parabellum  in the 1970s. They only accept 9×19mm Uzi magazines and are equipped with a classic folding or a special fixed polymer stock.

Users

: Used by GRUMEC

: Used in small numbers by SAVAK agents

:Formerly used by police forces
: Formerly  used by police forces
: Formerly used by the Special Actions Unit, Royal Malaysian Police, now on display at the Police Museum
: Used by police
:Used by GISGR, DGST and DGED

: Issued to special forces in the 1970s, later replaced by the Daewoo K1
: Used by various police forces
: Formerly used by police forces
: Used by the SAS and 14 Intelligence Company on operations in Northern Ireland
: Was used by special forces, including LRRPs and Navy SEALs, in the Vietnam War and the Invasion of Grenada; MAC-10s located in the inventories of Delta Force, and the 492nd Special Operations Wing
:Formerly used by general officer's bodyguards, later replaced by Mini-Uzi

 - One of the first buyers along with Chile

Non-state users
 Lebanese Forces
 Ulster Volunteer Force: Smuggled from Canada

See also
 McQ
 MGP-15 submachine gun
 Minebea PM-9
 Saab Bofors Dynamics CBJ-MS
 Type 77 submachine gun

References

External links

Operating Manual
Ingram MAC-10/11 on EnemyForces.com
MAC M10 and M11 on Modern Firearms
MAC-10 History Lesson
Nazarian's Guns Recognition Guide Mac 10 Silenced (MPEG video)

.45 ACP submachine guns
9mm Parabellum submachine guns
Machine pistols
Police weapons
Simple blowback firearms
Submachine guns of the United States
Telescoping bolt submachine guns
Weapons and ammunition introduced in 1970
Military equipment of the Vietnam War